Sergio Sánchez Hernández (born May 16, 1968, in Barcelona) is a vision impaired T12/B2 track and field athlete from Spain. He competed at the 1996 Summer Paralympics, where he won a gold medal in the 4 X 400 meter T11-T13 race, and a silver in the  400 meter T12 race.

References 

Living people
1968 births
Spanish male sprinters
Spanish disability athletes
Paralympic gold medalists for Spain
Paralympic silver medalists for Spain
Athletes (track and field) at the 1996 Summer Paralympics
Athletes from Barcelona
Paralympic athletes of Spain
Visually impaired sprinters
Sportsmen with disabilities
Medalists at the 1996 Summer Paralympics
Paralympic medalists in athletics (track and field)
Paralympic sprinters